1997 in Ghana details events of note that happened in Ghana in the year 1997.

Incumbents
 President: Jerry John Rawlings
 Vice President: John Atta Mills
 Chief Justice: Isaac Kobina Abban

Events

January
7 January - John Atta Mills is sworn in as Vice President of Ghana.

February

March
6 March  - 40th independence anniversary held.

April

May

June

July
1 July - Republic day celebrations held across the country.

August

September

October
3 October - Ghana Bar Association (GBA) re-elects Mr. Sam Okudzeto as its national president at a conference in Ho in the Volta region.
8 October - Ghana marks World Disaster Day.

November

December
Annual Farmers' Day celebrations held in all regions of the country.

Deaths
17 January - Susanna Al-Hassan, politician and writer, Ghana's first female parliamentary minister (born 1927)
30 November - Shamo Quaye, footballer (born 1971)

National holidays
 January 1: New Year's Day
 March 6: Independence Day
 May 1: Labor Day
 December 25: Christmas
 December 26: Boxing day

In addition, several other places observe local holidays, such as the foundation of their town. These are also "special days."

References

 
1990s in Ghana
Ghana
Years of the 20th century in Ghana
Ghana